John Powers is a former Mayor of Spokane, Washington.
 
He was the first mayor to serve under the Strong Mayor form of Government. He beat incumbent John Talbott in 2000, and served as mayor until losing in the 2003 mayoral primary to journalist Tom Grant and the future mayor Jim West. Powers finished third in the race and was unable to continue to the general election, which is a two-person head-to-head challenge (West and Grant). Though the position of Mayor wasn't partisan, Powers is considered a strong Democrat. After leaving office Powers was involved in promoting Kitsap regional development.

References

Year of birth missing (living people)
Living people
Mayors of Spokane, Washington